The Culuene River, or Kuluene River is a 600 km tributary of Xingu River in Mato Grosso, a state in western Brazil. The main economic activities in the region are agriculture and cattle farming.

It joins the Xingu from the southeast in the Xingu Indigenous Park. The Culuene Biological Reserve is south of the park in the municipality of Paranatinga, Mato Grosso.

See also
List of rivers of Mato Grosso

References

Rivers of Mato Grosso
Rivers of Xingu Indigenous Park